Soo Beng Kiang  (born 19 March 1968) is a former badminton player from Malaysia.

Career 
He had played with different pairs such as Cheah Soon Kit (1990–1994) and Tan Kim Her (1995-1996).

Soo competed in badminton at the 1996 Summer Olympics in men's doubles with Tan Kim Her. They defeated the no.3 seeds Rudy Gunawan and Bambang Suprianto of Indonesia in the last 16. In the semi-final, they lost to the eventual gold medalist, Rexy Mainaky and Ricky Subagja of Indonesia. In the bronze medal match, the duo lost hard-fought match also to the Indonesian pair, Antonius Ariantho and Denny Kantono.

Achievements

World Championships 
Men's doubles

World Cup 
Men's doubles

Asian Games 
Men's doubles

Asian Championships 
Men's doubles

Asian Cup 
Men's doubles

Southeast Asian Games 
Men's doubles

Mixed doubles

Commonwealth Games 
Men's doubles

IBF World Grand Prix 
The World Badminton Grand Prix sanctioned by International Badminton Federation (IBF) since 1983.

Men's doubles

IBF International 
Men's doubles

Honours 
  :
  Herald of the Order of Loyalty to the Royal Family of Malaysia (B.S.D.) (1988)
  Officer of the Order of the Defender of the Realm (K.M.N.) (1992)

References

External links 
 

1968 births
Living people
Place of birth missing (living people)
Malaysian sportspeople of Chinese descent
Malaysian male badminton players
Badminton players at the 1992 Summer Olympics
Badminton players at the 1996 Summer Olympics
Olympic badminton players of Malaysia
Badminton players at the 1990 Asian Games
Badminton players at the 1994 Asian Games
Asian Games silver medalists for Malaysia
Asian Games bronze medalists for Malaysia
Asian Games medalists in badminton
Medalists at the 1990 Asian Games
Medalists at the 1994 Asian Games
Badminton players at the 1994 Commonwealth Games
Commonwealth Games gold medallists for Malaysia
Commonwealth Games silver medallists for Malaysia
Commonwealth Games medallists in badminton
Competitors at the 1989 Southeast Asian Games
Competitors at the 1991 Southeast Asian Games
Competitors at the 1993 Southeast Asian Games
Competitors at the 1995 Southeast Asian Games
Southeast Asian Games gold medalists for Malaysia
Southeast Asian Games silver medalists for Malaysia
Southeast Asian Games bronze medalists for Malaysia
Southeast Asian Games medalists in badminton
World No. 1 badminton players
Medallists at the 1994 Commonwealth Games